The Minister for Social Development is a minister in the government of New Zealand with responsibility promoting social development and welfare, and is in charge of the Ministry of Social Development. The position was established in 1938 after the passing of the Social Security Act 1938.

The present Minister is Carmel Sepuloni.

List of Ministers
The following individuals have been appointed as Minister for Social Development:
Key

Notes

References

External links
New Zealand Ministry for Social Development

Social Development
Welfare in New Zealand